The Simon–Glatzel equation is an empirical correlation describing the pressure dependence of the melting temperature of a solid. The pressure dependence of the melting temperature is small for small pressure changes because the volume change during fusion or melting is rather small. However, at very high pressures higher melting temperatures are generally observed as the liquid usually occupies a larger volume than the solid making melting more thermodynamically unfavorable at elevated pressure. If the liquid has a smaller volume than the solid (as for ice and liquid water) a higher pressure leads to a lower melting point.

The equation and its variations 

 

The Simon–Glatzel equation can be viewed as a combination of the Murnaghan equation of state and the Lindemann law, and an alternative form was proposed by J. J. Gilvarry (1956):

Example parameters 

For methanol the following parameters can be obtained:

The reference temperature has been Tref = 174.61 K and the reference pressure Pref has been set to 0 kPa.

Methanol is a component where the Simon–Glatzel works well in the given validity range.

Extensions and generalizations 
The Simon–Glatzel equation is a monotonically increasing function. It can only describe the melting curves that rise indefinitely with increasing pressure. It may fail to describe the melting curves with a negative pressure dependence or local maximums. A damping term that asymptotically slopes down under pressure,  (c is another component-specific parameter), is introduced by Vladimir V. Kechin to extend the Simon–Glatzel equation so that all melting curves, rising, falling, and flattening, as well as curves with a maximum, can be described by a unified equation:

The unified equation may be rewritten as:

This form predicts that all solids have a maximum melting temperature at a positive or (fictitious) negative pressure.

References 

Phase transitions
Equations
Thermodynamics